The Endurance is a 2000 documentary film directed by George Butler about Ernest Shackleton's legendary Antarctic expedition in 1914. It is based on the book of the same name. Endurance was the name of the ship of Shackleton's expedition. Butler followed it up the next year with another documentary about Shackleton's expedition titled Shackleton's Antarctic Adventure.

Plot
After failing to be the first to reach the South Pole by only 97 miles in 1909, Shackleton set out to be the first to cross the Antarctic continent via the pole. The expedition met disastrous results when its ship became trapped and ultimately crushed in the ice pack. Shackleton and his 28-man crew endured the long polar winter before ultimately finding rescue following an 800-mile open boat voyage on the Weddell Sea. Against all odds, the entire crew of Endurance survived.  Frank Hurley's original film footage was used by Butler, along with interviews of surviving relatives to present the story of Shackleton's expedition.

Reception
The film was well received by critics, and was nominated for and won several awards.

See also
Survival film

References

External links
 

2000 films
British documentary films
Imperial Trans-Antarctic Expedition
Ernest Shackleton
Documentary films about Antarctica
2000 documentary films
Films directed by George Butler (filmmaker)
Films scored by Michael Small
2000s English-language films
2000s British films
English-language documentary films